The Little Irish Girl is a 1926 American silent romantic drama film produced and distributed by Warner Bros., directed by Roy Del Ruth and starring Dolores Costello. Based on the story The Grifters, written by Edith Joan Lyttleton, it is considered to be a lost film.

Cast

Preservation
This film is now lost. The Warner Bros. records of the film's negative have a notation, "Junked 12/27/48" (i.e., December 27, 1948). Warner Bros. destroyed many of its negatives in the late 1940s and 1950s due to nitrate film pre-1933 decomposition. Also, in February 1956, Jack Warner sold the rights to all of his pre-December 1949 films to Associated Artists Productions. In 1969, UA donated 16mm prints of some Warner Bros. films from outside the United States. No copies of The Little Irish Girl are known to exist.

See also
The Little French Girl (1925) starring Mary Brian

References

External links

Photo#1 and photo#2 stills of Dolores Costello
Lantern slide (archived)
Argentinean lobby poster (archived)

1926 films
American silent feature films
Films directed by Roy Del Ruth
Warner Bros. films
1926 romantic drama films
American romantic drama films
American black-and-white films
Lost American films
1926 lost films
Lost romantic drama films
1920s American films
Silent romantic drama films
Silent American drama films